Ojo de Vaca Station, was a Butterfield Overland Mail stagecoach station at Ojo de Vaca (Cow Springs), in New Mexico Territory. The site is now Cow Springs Ranch located in Luna County, New Mexico, United States.

History
Ojo de Vaca was a watering place on the old trail between Janos, Chihuahua, Mexico to the Santa Rita copper mines. When Cooke's Mormon Battalion was searching for a wagon route between the Rio Grande and California, they intercepted the old Mexican road at this spring, then followed it southward to Guadalupe Pass then westward and northward to Tucson, pioneering the route known as Cooke's Wagon Road. In 1849, Cooke's road became the major southern route of the forty-niners during the California Gold Rush and Ojo de Vaca spring was one of the reliable watering places on what became the Southern Emigrant Trail. Later Ojo de Vaca was a water station on the San Antonio-San Diego Mail Line and subsequently the Butterfield company built their stagecoach station there. It remained an important stop on this route until the long distance stagecoach lines ended in the late 19th century.

References

History of Luna County, New Mexico
Geography of Luna County, New Mexico
Springs of New Mexico
San Antonio–San Diego Mail Line
Butterfield Overland Mail in New Mexico Territory
Stagecoach stations in New Mexico
American frontier